In biochemistry, a protein dimer is a macromolecular complex formed by two protein monomers, or single proteins, which are usually non-covalently bound. Many macromolecules, such as proteins or nucleic acids, form dimers. The word dimer has roots meaning "two parts", di- + -mer. A protein dimer is a type of protein quaternary structure.

A protein homodimer is formed by two identical proteins. A protein heterodimer is formed by two different proteins.

Most protein dimers in biochemistry are not connected by covalent bonds. An example of a non-covalent heterodimer is the enzyme reverse transcriptase, which is composed of two different amino acid chains. An exception is dimers that are linked by disulfide bridges such as the homodimeric protein NEMO.

Some proteins contain specialized domains to ensure dimerization (dimerization domains) and specificity.

The G protein-coupled cannabinoid receptors have the ability to form both homo- and heterodimers with several types of receptors such as mu-opioid, dopamine and adenosine A2 receptors.

Examples 

 Transcription factors
 Leucine zipper motif proteins
 14-3-3 proteins
 Variable surface glycoproteins of the Trypanosoma parasite
 Tubulin
 Some clotting factors
 Factor XI
 Factor XIII
 Fibrinogen
 Some receptors
 Nuclear receptors
 G protein-coupled receptors
 G protein βγ-subunit dimer
 Toll-like receptor
 Receptor tyrosine kinases
 Some enzymes
 Type II restriction enzymes
 Triosephosphateisomerase (TIM)
 Alcohol dehydrogenase

Alkaline phosphatase

E. coli alkaline phosphatase, a dimer enzyme, exhibits intragenic complementation.  That is, when particular mutant versions of alkaline phosphatase were combined, the heterodimeric enzymes formed as a result exhibited a higher level of activity than would be expected based on the relative activities of the parental enzymes.  These findings indicated that the dimer structure of the E. coli alkaline phosphatase allows cooperative interactions between the constituent mutant monomers that can generate a more functional form of the holoenzyme.

See also
 Dimer (chemistry)
 Protein trimer
 Oligomer
 ProtCID

References 

Protein structure
Dimers (chemistry)
Protein complexes